Gavandar (also Romanized as Gavāndar and Govāndar) is a village in Maraveh Tappeh Rural District, in the Central District of Maraveh Tappeh County, Golestan Province, Iran. At the 2006 census, its population was 210, in 35 families.

References 

Populated places in Maraveh Tappeh County